These are the former and present vice-chancellors and chancellors of the University of Pretoria, South Africa.

Vice-chancellors
The vice-chancellor and principal is the head of the university, supported by four deputy vice-chancellors. Former and current persons who have fulfilled the position are:
A C Paterson: 1918–1924
N M Hoogenhout:1925–1927
A E du Toit:1927–1934
C F Schmidt:1935–1940
M C Botha:1941–1947
C H Rautenbach:1948–1970
E M Hamman:1970–1981
D M Joubert: 1982–1991
Flip P Smit: 1992–1996
J van Zyl: 1997–2001
 Calie Pistorius: 2001–2009
 Cheryl de la Rey: 2009–2018
 Tawana Kupe: 2019

Chancellors
The Chancellor is the titular head of the university. Former and current persons who have fulfilled the position are:

Justice Tielman Roos, Supreme Court of Appeal and South African Minister of Justice: 1930 – 1932
 Rev Adriaan Louw: 1933 – 1934
 Dr Hendrik van der Bijl, engineer and industrialist, founding chairman of Eskom and founder of ISCOR: 1934 – 1948
Advocate Charles Theodore Te Water, South African diplomat and President of the League of Nations: 1949 – 1964
Dr Hilgard Muller, Mayor of Pretoria and Minister for Foreign Affairs: 1965 – 1984
 The Honourable Alwyn Schlebusch, Minister of Public Works and Immigration, Minister of Justice and Internal Affairs, Minister in the Office of the President and South Africa's only Vice State President: 1984 – 1986
Dr Anton Rupert, South African entrepreneur, conservationist and billionaire : 1987 – 1992
 Dr Chris Stals, Governor of the South African Reserve Bank and multiple company directorships: 1992 – 2005
 Prof Wiseman Nkuhlu, South Africa's first black chartered accountant, economic advisor to the President, Chairman for the NEPAD steering committee, Chairman of the Development Bank of Southern Africa and multiple company directorships: 2006 to present

References

See also
List of South African university chancellors and vice-chancellors

 
 
Pretoria
University
Pretoria